Vice-Admiral Argentine Hugh Alington, Royal Navy (10 July 1876 – 25 March 1945) was an officer of the Royal Navy.

Personal life
Alington married Janet, who died 28 September 1935.  A memorial to her and their daughter, Nancy, can be found in Bainton parish church.
Alington died on the 25 of March, 1945 at the age of 68 in Stamford, Lincolnshire.

He has also witnessed the Scuttling of the German fleet at Scapa Flow.

References

External links
 Argentine Hugh Alington - The Dreadnought Project
 Catalogue description: Alington, Argentine Hugh

1876 births
1945 deaths
Royal Navy officers